Qaleh-ye Khanjan (also Romanized as Qal‘eh-ye Khānjān; also known as Khānjān Khān, Qal‘eh-ye Khānjān Khān, and Sar Tang-e Eslāmābād) is a village in Gerit Rural District, Papi District, Khorramabad County, Lorestan Province, Iran. At the 2006 census, its population was 119, in 23 families.

References 

Towns and villages in Khorramabad County